Myelois famula is a species of snout moth in the genus Myelois. It was described by Zeller in 1881, and is known from Colombia.

References

Moths described in 1881
Phycitini